Sven Åke Albert Rydell (14 January 1905 – 4 April 1975) was a Swedish footballer who played as a forward. He represented Holmens IS, Örgryte IS, and Redbergslids IK during a club career that spanned between 1920 and 1934. A full international between 1923 and 1932, he won 43 caps and scored 49 goals for the Sweden national team. He scored five goals at the 1924 Summer Olympics where Sweden finished third. He was the all-time leading scorer for the Sweden national team for more than 80 years before his record was overtaken by Zlatan Ibrahimović in September 2014.

Club career 
At club level, Rydell played for Örgryte IS, Redbergslids IK, and Holmens IS. Rydell had scored a record of nine hat-tricks for Sweden.

International career
Rydell played in the 1920s and 30s, and scored 49 goals in only 43 matches for the Swedish national team. His 49 goals stood as the national record for over 80 years. Because his career spanned the nascent years of international football, he never got a chance to play in the World Cup; his only appearance at the world stage came in the 1924 Summer Olympics, at which Sweden won a bronze medal. He was the all-time leading scorer for the Sweden national team until 4 September 2014, when Zlatan Ibrahimović overtook him by scoring his 50th international goal. However, he holds the record of scoring nine hat-tricks for Sweden.

Rydell was awarded the Svenska Dagbladet Gold Medal in 1931 after an impressive performance in an international game against Denmark in 1931.

Personal life
Rydell's daughter Eva represented Sweden as a gymnast in the 1960 and 1964 Olympics. Rydell died on 4 April 1975. He is buried at Östra kyrkogården in Gothenburg.

Career statistics

International

International goals

Scores and results list Sweden's goal tally first, score column indicates score after each Rydell goal.

Honours
Sweden

 Summer Olympics bronze medal: 1924

Individual

 Nordic Football Championship top scorer: 1924–1928
 Swedish Football Hall of Fame inductee: 2003
Records

 Most hat-tricks for the Sweden national team: nine

References

External links

profile

1905 births
1975 deaths
Swedish footballers
Sweden international footballers
Olympic bronze medalists for Sweden
Olympic footballers of Sweden
Footballers at the 1924 Summer Olympics
Swedish football managers
Örgryte IS managers
Olympic medalists in football
Allsvenskan players
Örgryte IS players
Medalists at the 1924 Summer Olympics
Footballers from Gothenburg
Association football forwards